Antoni "Toni" Gerona Salaet (born 31 July 1973) is a Spanish handball coach for the Al Rayyan.

Biography
Toni Gerona trained at the National Institute of Physical Education of Catalonia between 1992 and 1997 with a license in handball.

After obtaining his diploma, he became technical training manager for the Catalan Handball Federation until 2004.
At the same time, at FC Barcelona, Gerona took care of the Blaugrana youth teams from 1999 to 2004 and then, for three years, was Xesco Espar's assistant to the first team (2004-2008). In this role, he won the Champions League 2005 as well as the La Liga 2006. At the same time as the position of technical director of training (2008-2015), Gerona took over the management of the Barcelona reserve team (2009-2015). Gerona then coached the Qatari club of El Jaish from 2015 to 2017 and Al Rayyan from 2022 to present.

In July 2017, Toni Gerona joined the Tunisian national team for three years, winning 2018 African Nations Championship and coming in second in 2020. He reached the second round of the 2019 World Championship. In the summer of 2019, at 45 and having become French-speaking following his experience in Tunisia, Toni Gerona joined the C 'Chartres MHB, promoted to the French first division. He also retained his function at the head of the Tunisian national team. In Chartres, he signed up for two seasons, one of which was optional, and benefited from an extended technical staff, made up in particular of a physical trainer and the young retiree of the grounds, Ricardo Candeias, for the goalkeepers.

He was dismissed from Tunisia national team after failing to retain the African title. A few weeks later, then eleventh in the championship, he extended his contract by a year with C'Chartres MHB. In May 2020 he became head coach for Serbia national team.

Honours

Club
 EHF Champions League: 
 Winner: 2005 (assistant)
 Liga ASOBAL:
 Winner: 2006 (assistant)

National Team
 African Championship:
 Winner: 2018
 Runner-up: 2020
 Mediterranean Games:
 Runner-up: 2018
 Third place: 2022

References

1973 births
Living people
People from Tortosa
Sportspeople from the Province of Tarragona
Spanish handball coaches
Spanish expatriate sportspeople in Qatar
Spanish expatriate sportspeople in Tunisia
Spanish expatriate sportspeople in France
Spanish expatriate sportspeople in Serbia
Handball coaches of international teams
Spanish expatriate sportspeople in Ireland